This is a list of people from the University of Oxford involved in sport, exploration, and adventuring.  Many were students at one (or more) of the colleges of the University and others held fellowships at a college.

This list forms part of a series of lists of people associated with the University of Oxford – for other lists, please see the main article List of University of Oxford people.

List of sports people

James Allen (Lady Margaret Hall) 
Harry Altham
 John Bain (1854 – 1929), England footballer and 1877 FA Cup Finalist 
Roger Bannister (1929–2018), (Exeter and Merton)
Stuart Barnes (St Edmund Hall)
Paul Bennett (Kellogg College), Olympics gold medalist
 Francis Birley (University) Three-times winner of the FA Cup in the 1870s
Michael Blomquist (St Peter's)
Bernard Bosanquet
Tom Bourdillon (Balliol)
Robin Bourne-Taylor (Christ Church)
Bill Bradley (Worcester)
Charles Wreford-Brown (Oriel)
Clarence Bruce, 3rd Baron Aberdare (New College)
John Cyril Campbell, player and first football coach of Panathinaikos
Ed Coode (Keble)
Oliver Cook (Christ Church)
Steph Cook (Lincoln)
Colin Cowdrey, Baron Cowdrey of Tonbridge (Brasenose)
Gerry Crutchley President of Middlesex CCC 1958-62
Jamie Dalrymple (St Peter's)
Simon Danielli (Scotland Rugby International) (Trinity)
Rosamund Dashwood (Somerville)
Christopher Davidge Gold medallist in rowing at the 1962 British Empire and Commonwealth Games
Martin Donnelly
Hugh Edwards (Christ Church)
Jason Flickinger (Keble)
R. E. Foster
Tim Foster MBE (St Cross)
Fiona Freckleton (Somerville)
C. B. Fry (Wadham)
Darren Gerard, cricketer
Jennifer Goldsack (Somerville)
Luka Grubor (Somerville)
George Harris, 4th Baron Harris
David Hemery (St Catherine's)
Simon Hollingsworth (Exeter)
Chris Hollins
David Humphreys
Douglas Jardine
Malcolm Jardine
Allan Jay MBE (1931—), world champion and five-time-Olympian foil and épée fencer
Lauren Jeska, transgender fell-runner convicted of attempted murder
Brian Johnston (New College)
Imran Khan
David Kirk (Worcester)
Paul Klenerman (born 1963), Olympic sabre fencer
Sandra Landy (1938-2017)  international contract bridge player for England and for Great Britain; world champion 1981
Sophie Le Marchand (Somerville)
Christopher Liwski (St Catherine's)
Jack Lovelock (Exeter) gold medal British Empire Games 1934, gold medal Olympic Games 1936
Joseph von Maltzahn (Kellogg)
Lucas McGee (Oriel)
Tom McMillen (University)
Alan Melville
Max Mosley (Christ Church) President of the Fédération Internationale de l'Automobile 1993-
John Nunn (Oriel) Chess Grandmaster ranked =9th in the world in 1985
Anton Oliver (Worcester)
Cuthbert Ottaway (Brasenose)

Iftikhar Ali Khan Pataudi
Mansoor Ali Khan Pataudi
John Misha Petkevich
Sir Matthew Pinsent CBE (St Catherine's)
Ronald Poulton-Palmer (Balliol)
Pete Reed (Wolfson and Oriel)
Patricia Reid (Somerville)
Joe Roff (Harris Manchester)
Myron Rolle
Mary Russell Vick (Somerville)
James Schroder (Christ Church)
Brough Scott (Corpus Christi)
Jonathan Searle MBE (Christ Church)
Smit Singh (Somerville)
Dorjana Širola (Somerville)
Colin Smith (St Catherine's)
M. J. K. Smith
John J. Tigert (Pembroke)
Claire Tomlinson (Somerville)
Andrew Triggs Hodge (St Catherine's)
Dick Twining President of Middlesex CCC 1950–57, President Marylebone Cricket Club 1964–65
Sir Pelham Warner
William Webb-Ellis (Brasenose)
Matthew Wells (Balliol)
Jacob Wetzel (Linacre)
Barney Williams (Jesus)
Buffy-Lynne Williams (St Hugh's)
Zoe de Toledo (Harris Manchester)

Adventurers and explorers

Gertrude Bell (Lady Margaret Hall)
Apsley Cherry-Garrard (Christ Church)
Richard Francis Burton (Trinity)
Thomas Coryat (Gloucester Hall)
Peter Fleming (Christ Church)
Emily Georgiana Kemp (Somerville)
T. E. Lawrence (Lawrence of Arabia) (Jesus and All Souls) 
Walter Raleigh (Oriel)
Cecil Rhodes (Oriel)
Katherine Routledge (Somerville)
Andrew Irvine (Merton)
Alex Hibbert (St Hugh's)

See also
Other names can be found Sport in Oxford, as well as its subcategories, especially Rowing in Oxford, Oxford University cricketers, and Oxford University AFC players

References

 People
Oxford